Sreten Sretenović (born 12 January 1985) is a Serbian former professional footballer who played as a central defender.

Club career
Born in Čačak, Socialist Federal Republic of Yugoslavia, Sretenović began his career at FK Rad where he quickly came into prominence, his size assuring him a starting eleven spot as the Belgrade club suffered relegation in his first season in the Serbian SuperLiga.

After the 2006–07 campaign, the first since the separation of Serbia and Montenegro, with Rad failing to return to the top division, Sretenović stated his desire to play in western Europe and, on 29 June 2007, was signed by Portugal's S.L. Benfica. However, he was quickly discarded by the man who required his services, Fernando Santos; with the latter's sacking after the first matchday in 2007–08 and the subsequent replacement with José Antonio Camacho, he remained in Benfica's payroll, having been loaned to Zagłębie Lubin in the Polish Ekstraklasa.

In June 2008, Sretenović was transferred to FC Timişoara in the Romanian Liga I. On 20 February of the following year, he was purchased by Russia's FC Kuban Krasnodar for the start of the season.

On 31 January 2011, after an unassuming spell in the Portuguese second level with Leixões SC, Sretenović signed for NK Olimpija Ljubljana. In his second year, he became team captain.

References

External links

PrvaLiga profile 

1985 births
Living people
Sportspeople from Čačak
Serbian footballers
Association football central defenders
Serbian SuperLiga players
FK Rad players
FK Partizan players
FK Borac Čačak players
Liga Portugal 2 players
S.L. Benfica footballers
Leixões S.C. players
Ekstraklasa players
Zagłębie Lubin players
MKS Cracovia (football) players
Liga I players
FC Politehnica Timișoara players
Russian Premier League players
FC Kuban Krasnodar players
Slovenian PrvaLiga players
NK Olimpija Ljubljana (1945–2005) players
K League 1 players
Gyeongnam FC players
Sreten Sretenovic
Sreten Sretenovic
Serbian expatriate footballers
Expatriate footballers in Portugal
Expatriate footballers in Poland
Expatriate footballers in Romania
Expatriate footballers in Russia
Expatriate footballers in Slovenia
Expatriate footballers in South Korea
Expatriate footballers in Thailand
Serbian expatriate sportspeople in Portugal
Serbian expatriate sportspeople in Poland
Serbian expatriate sportspeople in Romania
Serbian expatriate sportspeople in Russia
Serbian expatriate sportspeople in South Korea
Serbian expatriate sportspeople in Thailand